Tabanus abdominalis is a species of horse fly in the family Tabanidae.

Distribution
United States.

References

Tabanidae
Taxa named by Johan Christian Fabricius
Insects described in 1805
Diptera of North America